1 Peter 4 is the fourth chapter of the First Epistle of Peter in the New Testament of the Christian Bible. The author identifies himself as "Peter, an apostle of Jesus Christ" and the epistle is traditionally attributed to Peter the Apostle, but some writers argue that it is the work of Peter's followers in Rome between 70 and 100 CE. This chapter focusses on Christ's suffering, Christian charity and advice to those who are persecuted.

Text
The original text was written in Koine Greek.This chapter is divided into 19 verses.

Textual witnesses
Some early manuscripts containing the text of this chapter are:
Greek
Papyrus 72 (3rd/4th century)
Codex Vaticanus (325-350)
Codex Sinaiticus (330–360)
Codex Alexandrinus (400–440)
Codex Ephraemi Rescriptus (c. 450; extant verses 1–4)
Latin
Codex Floriacensis (6th century Old-Latin; extant verses 17–19)

Old Testament references
 : 
 :

Living a Christian Life (4:1–11)

Verse 1
Therefore, since Christ suffered for us in the flesh, arm yourselves also with the same mind, for he who has suffered in the flesh has ceased from sin.
The same point has been made in : Christ also suffered for us (or "you"), leaving us (or "you") an example, that you should follow His steps.

Verse 6For this reason the gospel was preached also to those who are dead, that they might be judged according to men in the flesh, but live according to God in the spirit. "Gospel": means "the good news", here concerning 'the incarnation, sufferings, and death of Christ', and the salvation through him'; this is basically 'the doctrines of grace, pardon, righteousness, and eternal life'.
 "preached": to proclaim it 'openly, freely, and boldly, with faithfulness and consistence'.
"To them that are dead": Theologian John Gill regards "dead" here not in a figurative sense, but "dead in trespasses and sins", as is the case of all mankind or all nations, and is the means of 'quickening dead sinners'. The word "dead" is also used as in the preceding verse, got those who had been alive, but were now dead in a natural sense, whom Christ would judge together with those found alive when he comes; that the Gospel has been preached also to them that are already dead, as well as to those who are now alive.
"Live according to God in the Spirit": Although believers were  condemned by others while they were here on earth, the Gospel had such an effect upon them, as to cause them to live spiritually, to live by faith on Christ, to live according to the will of God, so though dead in their bodies, they live in their spirits or souls an eternal life of happiness with God, according to his 'eternal purpose, unchangeable covenant, promise, grace, and love'.

Submit to Suffering (4:12–19)
Christians may have to suffer, but they are blessed if it is purely due to their faith, not any criminal or antisocial behavior.

Verse 16Yet if any man suffer as a Christian, let him not be ashamed; but let him glorify God on this behalf.''
"Christian": This is the third mention of the term in the New Testament—after the first use in Antioch (Acts 11:26) and second mention by Herod Agrippa II (Acts 26:28)—where all three usages are considered to reflect a derisive element referring to the followers of Christ who did not acknowledge the emperor of Rome.

See also
 Books of the Bible
 Gospel
 Jesus Christ
 Related Bible parts: Proverbs 10, Proverbs 11, Isaiah 11, Matthew 5

References

Sources

External links
 King James Bible - Wikisource
English Translation with Parallel Latin Vulgate
Online Bible at GospelHall.org (ESV, KJV, Darby, American Standard Version, Bible in Basic English)
Multiple bible versions at Bible Gateway (NKJV, NIV, NRSV etc.)

1 Peter 4